The fourth season of the American psychological thriller television series You was ordered by Netflix on October 13, 2021. You series co-creator Sera Gamble returns as showrunner. Series star Penn Badgley returns as Joe Goldberg and Tati Gabrielle reprises her role as Marienne Bellamy, with Charlotte Ritchie, Tilly Keeper, Amy-Leigh Hickman, Ed Speleers and Lukas Gage joining the main cast. Filming began in March 2022, primarily in London, and concluded in August. The season was split in two parts, with the first part premiering on February 9, 2023, and the second part premiered on March 9, 2023.

Cast

Main 
 Penn Badgley as Joe Goldberg, a university professor under the alias Jonathan Moore
 Tati Gabrielle as Marienne Bellamy, Joe's love interest from the previous season
 Charlotte Ritchie as Kate Galvin, an icy and adversarial gallery manager in whom Joe takes an interest
 Tilly Keeper as Lady Phoebe, a notorious but kind-hearted socialite hailing from an aristocratic family, and Kate's best friend
 Amy-Leigh Hickman as Nadia Farran, a literature major in Joe's class
 Ed Speleers as Rhys Montrose, an author whose memoir lifted him out of poverty, got him into Oxford and helped him launch a political career
 Lukas Gage as Adam Pratt, an American expatriate who is the wealthy, playboy son of a prominent East Coast family, and is dating Phoebe

Recurring 
 Stephen Hagan as Malcolm Harding, a literature professor and partying, drug-loving bon vivant who lives in the apartment across from Joe. He introduces Joe to Kate and her friend group.
 Adam James as Elliot Tannenberg, a fixer working for Love's family who gives Joe his cover identity in London
 Aidan Cheng as Simon Soo, an aspiring artist and son of a Chinese tech mogul
 Niccy Lin as Sophie Soo, a social media influencer and Simon's sister
 Eve Austin as Gemma Graham-Greene, a pompous socialite in the Oxford friend group
 Ozioma Whenu as Blessing Bosede, a successful Nigerian princess with multiple university degrees from Oxford and a member of the friendship group
 Sean Pertwee as Vic, Phoebe's personal driver and bodyguard
 Ben Wiggins as Roald Walker-Burton, an aristocrat and Kate's childhood friend
 Dario Coates as Connie, a sportsman who is a part of the Oxford friendship group
 Brad Alexander as Edward, a student in Joe's class. He has a fierce academic rivalry with Nadia, who he goes onto date.
 Alison Pargeter as Dawn Brown, a paparazzi photographer who is obsessed with Lady Phoebe
 Greg Kinnear as Tom Lockwood, Kate's estranged American father who is a powerful activist shareholder in a number of shady business dealings

Guest
 Victoria Pedretti as Love Quinn
 Elizabeth Lail as Guinevere Beck

Episodes

Production

Development 
On October 13, 2021, ahead of the third season premiere, You was renewed by Netflix for a fourth season.

Writing 
The season is primarily set in London, the first time outside the United States, and showrunner Sera Gamble said protagonist Joe Goldberg is "great when he's in an environment that's not natural to him, that's foreign to him". Part of the decision to set the story in another country arose from Gamble's decision to explore the world further after watching many other international series on Netflix while quarantining during the COVID-19 pandemic. The story is also briefly set in Paris, the idea being co-creator Greg Berlanti's, and Gamble noted that since it is not a familiar place to Joe, he is like a "fish out of water". Penn Badgley, who portrays Joe, said that while the fourth season would retain the tone of the series, "We're using a different format [...] It's almost like we're shifting the genre slightly".

Casting 
In February 2022, Lukas Gage was cast as a series regular for the season. A month later, Charlotte Ritchie was also cast as a regular. Tati Gabrielle was also confirmed to be returning from the third season, though unclear in what capacity. In April 2022, Tilly Keeper, Amy-Leigh Hickman, and Ed Speleers were cast as new series regulars, with Gabrielle confirmed to be returning as a regular, while Niccy Lin, Aidan Cheng, Stephen Hagan, Ben Wiggins, Eve Austin, Ozioma Whenu, Dario Coates, Sean Pertwee, Brad Alexander, Alison Pargeter and Adam James joined the cast in recurring roles for the fourth season. Jenna Ortega had been offered to reprise her role of Ellie Alves from the second season, but declined due to scheduling conflicts with the TV series Wednesday.

Filming 
Filming began on March 22, 2022, in the United Kingdom, and concluded on August 27. According to reports on social media, in April 2022, filming took place at Royal Holloway, University of London. In June, a scene was filmed by River Thames. Badgley made his directorial debut with the ninth episode of the season. The season features fewer intimate sex scenes than previous seasons in accordance with Badgley's wishes, citing his discomfort with such scenes.

Release 
The season was split into two five-episode parts, with the first part premiering on February 9, 2023, and the second on March 9.

Reception
For the fourth season, the review aggregator website Rotten Tomatoes reported a 92% approval rating with an average rating of 7.3/10, based on 53 critic reviews. The website's critics consensus reads, "The hunter becomes prey in Yous London-set fourth season, which shows some wear as this premise begins to outlive its believability—but Penn Badgley's sardonic performance continues to paper over most lapses in logic." Metacritic, which uses a weighted average, assigned a score of 73 out of 100 based on 20 critics, indicating "generally favorable reviews".

References

External links 
 
 

Split television seasons
2023 American television seasons
Season 4